Ricardo do Pilar (1635–1700) was a Brazilian monk and painter.

Ricardo was born in Cologne where he studied art, then moved to Brazil around 1660. There he worked as a painter for the Monastery of St. Benedict in Rio de Janeiro. In 1670 he joined the monastery as a secular brother. Brother Ricardo officially joined the Order of Saint Benedict in 1695. He primarily painted portraits of saints and monks living at the monastery. He died in Rio de Janeiro in 1700.

References
 Some of the content was partly translated from the Portuguese Wikipedia article: Ricardo do Pilar (Portuguese)

Brazilian painters
1700 deaths
1635 births
Brazilian Benedictines
Artists from Cologne
German emigrants to Brazil